Gandhipuram is a locality situated in East Godavari district within Rajahmundry town in Andhra Pradesh State.

References

Villages in East Godavari district